Lago di Scanno is a lake in the Province of L'Aquila, Abruzzo, Italy. It is located in the Appennino Abruzzese north of Parco Nazionale d'Abruzzo, Lazio e Molise. On its southern shore is Scanno and on its northern shore is Villalago. The Sagittario flows out of the lake towards the north. The part of the Sagittario river that flows into the lake from the south is known as the Tasso.

It is of the shape of a heart.

References

External links 
 

Lakes of Abruzzo
Scanno, Abruzzo